The first African American mayors were elected during Reconstruction in the Southern United States beginning about 1867. African Americans in the South were also elected to many local offices, such as sheriff or Justice of the Peace, and state offices such as legislatures as well as a smaller number to Federal offices. After this period ended in 1876, it became increasingly difficult for African Americans to compete in elections due to racial discrimination such as Jim Crow laws. After the end of the 19th century it generally was not until the 1960s, they again began to be elected or appointed to mayoral positions following the civil rights movement and passage of the Civil Rights Act of 1964 and Voting Rights Act of 1965. Achievements in African Americans' being elected mayor in majority-European American and other municipalities made their political participation one of daily life in many localities. In 1970 there were fewer than 50 African American mayors; by 1982 there were 205.

1860s

1867 

 First African-American appointed mayor of a U.S. town as mayor of St. Martinville, Louisiana: Monroe Baker

1868 
 First African American elected mayor of a U.S. town as mayor of Donaldsonville, Louisiana: Pierre Caliste Landry
 First African-American mayor of Kingstree, South Carolina: Stephen Atkins Swails

1869 
 First African-American mayor of Maryville, Tennessee: William Bennett Scott Sr.

1870s

1870 
 First African American elected mayor of a Mississippi city: Robert H. Wood, Natchez, Mississippi

1878 

 First African American elected to serve as mayor in the state of New York: Edward "Ned" Sherman, Cleveland, New York

1880s

1887 
 Founding mayor: Columbus H. Boger, Eatonville, Florida

1888 
 First African American elected to the office of mayor in California and probably the first elected mayor in the Western United States: Edward P. Duplex, Wheatland, California

1899 
 Founding mayor of Hobson City, Alabama; S.L. David

1900s

1905 
 Founding mayor of Boley, Oklahoma: T. B. Armstrong

1910s

1918 
 Founding mayor of Robbins, Illinois: Thomas J. Kellar

1920s

1926 
 Lawnside, New Jersey became a self-governing community in 1926 and has elected African-American mayors since its inception.

1960s

1964 
 First African-American mayor of Richmond, California: George D. Carroll

1966 
 First African-American mayor of Flint, Michigan: Floyd J. McCree
 First African-American mayor of Lake Elsinore, California: Thomas R. Yarborough
 First African-American mayor of Milpitas, California: Ben F. Gross
 [[First African-American mayor of El Centro, California: DuBois McGee

1967 
 First elected African-American mayor of Gary, Indiana: Richard G. Hatcher
 First African-American mayor of a large U.S. city, Cleveland, Ohio: Carl Stokes
 First African American appointed mayor of Washington, D.C.: Walter Washington (see also: 1975)
 First African American elected mayor of Ypsilanti, Michigan: John Burton

1968 
 First African American elected mayor of Montclair, New Jersey: Matthew G. Carter
 First African-American mayor of a Kentucky city: Luska Twyman, Glasgow, Kentucky
 First African American elected mayor of a predominantly white southern city: Howard Nathaniel Lee, Chapel Hill, North Carolina

1969 
 First African American elected mayor of Fayette, Mississippi: Charles Evers
 First African American mayor of Compton, California: Douglas Dollarhide
 First African American elected mayor of East Orange, New Jersey: William Stanford Hart Sr.
 First African American elected mayor of Chapel Hill, North Carolina: Howard Nathaniel Lee

1970s

1970 
 First African American elected mayor of Newark, New Jersey: Kenneth A. Gibson
 First African American elected mayor of Dayton, Ohio: James H. McGee
 First African American appointed mayor of Wichita, Kansas: A. Price Woodard
 First African-American elected mayor of Salina, Kansas: Robert C. Caldwell
 First African American elected mayor of Chesilhurst, New Jersey: George J. Phillips
 First African American appointed mayor of Carson, California: Gilbert D. Smith

1971 
 First African-American appointed mayor of Gainesville, Florida since the Reconstruction era: Neil A. Butler
 First African American appointed mayor of Grand Rapids, Michigan: Lyman Parks (see also: 1973)
 First African-American mayor of Englewood, New Jersey: Walter Scott Taylor
 First African American elected mayor of Berkeley, California: Warren Widener

1972 
 First African-American mayor of Tallahassee, Florida and first African-American mayor of a state capital: James R. Ford
 First African-American mayor of Cincinnati, Ohio: Ted Berry
 First African American appointed mayor of Leavenworth, Kansas: Benjamin Day

1973 
 First African American elected mayor of Detroit, Michigan: Coleman Young
 First African American elected mayor of Raleigh, North Carolina: Clarence Lightner
 First African American elected mayor of a city in Georgia, Greenville: Richmond D. Hill
 First African American elected mayor of a major Southern city: Maynard Jackson, Atlanta, Georgia
 First African American elected mayor of a major Western city: Tom Bradley, Los Angeles, California
 First African-American woman mayor: Lelia Foley, Taft, Oklahoma
 First African-American woman mayor of a major satellite city: Doris A. Davis, Compton, California
 First African American elected mayor of Grand Rapids, Michigan: Lyman Parks (see also: 1971)

1974 
 First African American elected mayor of Waco, Texas: Oscar Du Conge
 First African American appointed mayor of Pontiac, Michigan: Wallace E. Holland
 First African American elected mayor of Boulder, Colorado: Penfield Tate
 First African American woman elected mayor of Fairplay, Colorado: Ada B. Evans
 First African American elected mayor of Berkeley Township, New Jersey: Edward Tolbert
 First African American elected mayor of Matawan, New Jersey and first African American mayor in Monmouth County: Philip N. Gumbs 
 First African American elected mayor of Paulsboro, New Jersey: Elwood Hampton
 First African American elected mayor of Randolph, New Jersey: Tyrone Barnes
 First African American mayor of Bridgewater, New York and first African American mayor in New York State: Everett Holmes

1975 
 First African American elected mayor, and first elected mayor, of Washington, D.C.: Walter Washington (see also: 1967)
 First African-American mayor of Santa Monica, California: Nat Trives
 First African-American mayor of Opa-Locka, Florida and first African-American mayor in Dade County: Albert Tresvant

1976 
 First African American elected mayor of Pocatello, Idaho and first African American elected mayor in the state of Idaho: Thomas L. Purce
 First African-American mayor of Seaside, California: Oscar Lawson
 First African-American mayor of Opelousas, Louisiana: John W. Joseph
 First African-American mayor in New Mexico and First African-American mayor of Las Cruces, New Mexico: Albert Johnson

1977 
 First African-American mayor of Richmond, Virginia: Henry L. Marsh (Note: elected from within nine City Council members; changed to general election in 2003)

1978 
 First African American elected mayor of Oakland, California: Lionel Wilson
 First African American elected mayor of New Orleans: Ernest Nathan Morial

1979 
 First African American elected mayor of Birmingham, Alabama: Richard Arrington, Jr.
 First African American appointed mayor of New London, Connecticut: Leo E. Jackson
 First African American elected mayor of Rock Island, Illinois: James R. Davis

1980s

1980 
 First African American mayor of Menlo Park, California: Billy Ray White

1981 
 First African American elected mayor of Camden, New Jersey: Randy Primas
 First African American elected mayor of Spokane, Washington: James Everett Chase
 First African American elected mayor of Plainfield, New Jersey, and first African American elected mayor in Central New Jersey: Everett C. Lattimore
 First African-American mayor of Little Rock, Arkansas: Charles E. Bussey Jr.
 First African-American mayor of Winter Haven, Florida: Lemuel Geathers 
 First African-American mayor of Hartford, Connecticut: Thirman L. Milner

1982 
 First African American succeeds to the office of mayor of Memphis, Tennessee after the resignation of his predecessor: J.O. Patterson, Jr.
 First African-American mayor of Teaneck, New Jersey: Bernard E. Brooks
 First female African American mayor in the state of Florida and first female mayor of Opa-locka, Florida: Helen L. Miller

1983 
 First African American elected Mayor of Chicago: Harold Washington
 First African American elected mayor of Charlotte, North Carolina: Harvey Gantt
 First African American elected Mayor of Flint: James Sharp

1984 
 First African American elected Mayor of Atlantic City, New Jersey: James L. Usry
 First African American elected Mayor of Philadelphia, Pennsylvania: Wilson Goode
 First African American elected mayor of Portsmouth, Virginia: James W. Holley III
 First African American appointed mayor of Peekskill, New York: Richard E. Jackson

1985 
 First African-American appointed mayor of Gainesville, Georgia: John W. Morrow Jr.
 First African-American appointed mayor of Lynwood, California: Robert Henning
 First African American elected mayor of Mount Vernon, New York, and first African American elected mayor in New York: Ronald Blackwood
 First African American appointed mayor of Mount Pleasant, Tennessee and first African-American appointed mayor in the state of Tennessee: Willie B. Baker

1986 
 First African American and first woman mayor of Newport News, Virginia: Jessie M. Rattley
 First African American appointed mayor of Lynwood, California: Evelyn Wells

1987 
 First African American woman elected mayor of a major city Hartford, Connecticut: Carrie Saxon Perry
 First African American succeeds to the office of mayor of Baltimore, Maryland: Clarence H. Burns
 First African American elected mayor of Fairbanks, Alaska: James C. Hayes
 First African American elected mayor of Tacoma, Washington: Harold Moss
 First African American woman and first woman mayor of Little Rock, Arkansas: Lottie Shackelford

1988 
 First African American elected mayor of Baltimore, Maryland: Kurt Schmoke
 First African American elected mayor of Hempstead, New York: James A. Garner
 First African American elected mayor of Orange, New Jersey: Robert L. Brown

1989 
 First African American elected mayor of New York City: David Dinkins
 First African American elected mayor of New Haven, Connecticut: John C. Daniels
 First African American elected mayor of Richmond, California: George Livingston
 First African American elected mayor of Rockford, Illinois: Charles Box
 First African American elected mayor of Seattle, Washington: Norm Rice
 First African American succeeds to the office of mayor of Minden, Louisiana, after the recall of his predecessor: Robert T. Tobin
 First African American elected mayor of Asbury Park, New Jersey:Thomas S. Smith
 First African-American mayor of Victorville, California: James Busby (politician)

1990s

1990 
 First African American elected Mayor of Trenton, New Jersey: Douglas Palmer
 First African American elected mayor of New Bern, North Carolina: Leander R. "Lee" Morgan
 First African-American mayor of Lynchburg, Virginia: M.W. Thornhill Jr.
 First African American elected mayor of Chandler, Arizona: Coy Payne
 First African American elected mayor of New York City: David Dinkins
 First African American elected mayor of Irvington, New Jersey: Michael G. Steele

1991 
 First African American elected mayor of Memphis, Tennessee: W. W. Herenton
 First African American elected mayor of Denver, Colorado: Wellington Webb
 First African American elected mayor of Kansas City, Missouri: Emanuel Cleaver
 First African American woman elected mayor of Washington, D.C.: Sharon Pratt Kelly
 First African-American mayor of Trenton, New Jersey: Douglas Palmer
 First African-American mayor of Salem, New Jersey: Leon F. Johnson 
 First African-American mayor elected in the state of Wisconsin as the mayor of Fitchburg: Frances Huntley-Cooper

1992 
 First African American male elected mayor of Cambridge, Massachusetts: Kenneth Reeves
 First African American mayor in the state of Alaska as mayor of Fairbanks: James C. Hayes

1993 
 First African American elected mayor of St. Louis, Missouri: Freeman Bosley Jr.
 First African American elected mayor of Rochester, New York: William A. Johnson Jr.
 First African American and first woman elected mayor of Minneapolis, Minnesota: Sharon Sayles Belton
 First African American woman and first woman elected mayor of Irvington, New Jersey: Sara Bost

1995 
 First African American elected mayor of Dallas, Texas: Ron Kirk
 First African American elected mayor of Savannah, Georgia: Floyd Adams, Jr.

1996 
 First African American elected mayor of San Francisco, California: Willie Brown
 First African American elected mayor of Monroe, Louisiana: Abe E. Pierce, III
 First African American elected mayor of Pleasant Valley, Missouri: Abram "Abe" McGull

1997 
 First African American elected mayor of Dolton, Illinois: William Shaw
 First African American elected mayor of Jackson, Mississippi: Harvey Johnson, Jr.
 First African American elected mayor of Houston, Texas: Lee P. Brown
 First African American elected mayor of Des Moines, Iowa: Preston Daniels
 First African American elected mayor of Paterson, New Jersey: Martin G. Barnes
 First African-American succeeds to the mayor of Colorado Springs, Colorado after the resignation of his predecessor: Leon Young
 First African-born Black mayor in the United States elected as mayor of East Cleveland, Ohio: Emmanuel Onunwor
 First African-American mayor of District Heights, Maryland: Jack Sims Jr.

1998 
 First African-American mayor of Jasper, Texas: R. C. Horn
 First African-American female elected mayor of Cambridge, Massachusetts: E. Denise Simmons
 First African-American mayor of Hopewell, Virginia: Curtis West Harris
 First African-American and first woman mayor of Lecompte, Louisiana: Rosa Mae Scott Jones

1999 
 First African-American mayor of Pineville, Louisiana: Clarence R. Fields (became interim mayor in 1999; was elected to a partial term in 2000 and re-elected to full terms in 2002, 2006, 2010, and 2014)
 First African-American mayor of Elyria, Ohio: Thomas O. Shores
 First African-American mayor of Forest Park, Ohio: Stephanie Summerow Dumas

2000s

2000 
 First African American elected mayor of Columbus, Ohio: Michael B. Coleman
 First African American elected mayor of Selma, Alabama: James Perkins, Jr.
 First African American elected mayor of Oceanside, California: Terry Johnson
 First African American elected mayor in the state of Wyoming as mayor of Worland, Wyoming: LaVertha Gotier

2001 
 First African American elected mayor of Hattiesburg, Mississippi: Johnny DuPree
 First African-American woman mayor of a major Southern city, and first woman to be elected mayor of Atlanta, Georgia: Shirley Franklin 
 First African American and first woman elected mayor of Southfield, Michigan: Brenda L. Lawrence
 First African American elected mayor of Fayetteville, North Carolina: Marshall Pitts Jr.
 First African-American female Republican elected mayor of Tchula, Mississippi: Yvonne Brown
 First African American Mayor of Jersey City, New Jersey: Glenn Cunningham
 First African-American appointed female mayor of Gainesville, Georgia: Myrtle Figueras

2002 
 First African-American woman elected mayor of Dayton, Ohio: Rhine McLin
 First African American elected mayor of Toledo, Ohio: Jack Ford

2003 
 First African-American elected mayor of Palm Springs, California: Ron Oden
 First African American elected by citizens as mayor of Tallahassee, Florida: John Marks
 First African-American elected mayor, and first elected mayor, of San Ramon, California: H. Abram Wilson

2004 
 First African American elected mayor of Baton Rouge, Louisiana: Kip Holden
 First African-American mayor of Milwaukee, Wisconsin: Marvin Pratt
 First African American elected mayor of Pine Bluff, Arkansas: Carl A. Redus Jr.
 First African-American elected female mayor of Waco, Texas: Mae Jackson
 First African-American appointed female mayor of East Cleveland, Ohio: Saratha Goggins

2005 
 First African American elected mayor of Buffalo, New York: Byron Brown
 First African American elected mayor of Mobile, Alabama: Sam Jones
 First African American elected mayor of Asheville, North Carolina: Terry Bellamy
 First African American elected mayor of Cincinnati, Ohio: Mark Mallory
 First African American elected mayor of Youngstown, Ohio: Jay Williams
 First African American and woman elected mayor of Greenwood, Mississippi: Sheriel F. Perkins
 First African-American succeeds to the office of mayor of Orlando, Florida: Ernest Page

2006 
 First African American elected mayor of Shreveport, Louisiana: Cedric Glover
 First African American elected mayor of Anderson, South Carolina: Terence Roberts
 First African-American mayor of Duarte, California: Lois Gaston
 First African American elected mayor of Killeen, Texas: Timothy Hancock

2007 
 First African-American woman and first woman elected mayor of Baltimore, Maryland: Sheila Dixon
 First African American elected mayor of Greensboro, North Carolina: Yvonne Johnson
 First African American elected mayor of Wichita, Kansas: Carl Brewer
 First African American elected mayor of South Harrison Township, New Jersey: Charles Tyson

2008 
 First African American elected mayor of Blue Springs, Missouri: Carson Ross
 First African American elected mayor of Lancaster, Texas: Marcus Knight
 First African American elected mayor of Mansfield, Ohio: Donald Culliver
  First African American elected mayor of Sacramento, California: Kevin Johnson
 First African American mayor of Festus, Missouri: Earl Cook
 First African-American and first woman elected mayor of Cambridge, Maryland: Victoria Jackson-Stanley

2009 
 First African American elected mayor of Philadelphia, Mississippi: James Young
 First African American elected mayor of Freeport, New York: Andrew Hardwick
 First African-American woman elected mayor of Brentwood, Maryland: Xzavier Montgomery-Wright
 First African American and first woman elected mayor of Harrisburg, Pennsylvania: Linda D. Thompson

2010s

2010 
 First African-American woman elected mayor of Fontana, California: Acquanetta Warren
 First African American elected mayor of Columbia, South Carolina: Stephen K. Benjamin
 First African American elected mayor of Bridgeton, New Jersey: Albert B. Kelly

2011 
 First African American elected mayor of Jacksonville, Florida: Alvin Brown
 First African-American mayor of Knoxville, Tennessee: Daniel Brown
 First African-American woman elected mayor of Savannah, Georgia: Edna Jackson

2012 
 First African-American mayor of Ithaca, New York: Svante Myrick
 First African-American mayor of Antioch, California: Wade Harper
 First African American and first female mayor of Orrville, Alabama: Louvenia Diane Lumpkin
 First African-American mayor of Phenix City, Alabama: Eddie Lowe
 First African-American woman and first woman elected mayor of Gary, Indiana: Karen Freeman-Wilson

2013 
 First African-American mayor of Plano, Texas: Harry LaRosiliere
 First African-American mayor of Meridian, Mississippi: Percy Bland
 First African-American mayor of Hawthorne, California: Chris Brown

2014 
 First African-American mayor of Quitman, Georgia: James C. Brown III
 First African-American mayor of Adairsville, Georgia: Kenneth J. Carson
 First African-American female mayor of New Haven, Connecticut, and first woman: Toni Harp
 First African-American mayor of Brunswick, Georgia: Cornell Harvey
 First African-American female mayor of San Antonio, Texas: Ivy Taylor
 First African-American woman elected mayor of Shreveport, Louisiana: Ollie Tyler
 First African-American female Mayor of Teaneck, New Jersey, as well as the first African-American female mayor of any municipality in Bergen County, New Jersey: Lizette Parker
 Second African-American mayor of Rochester, New York: Lovely Warren, also first Female African-American mayor of Rochester.
 First African-American mayor of Linden, New Jersey: Derek Armstead

2015 
 First African American and first African-American woman elected mayor of Pearsall, Texas: Mary Moore
 First African American and first African-American woman elected mayor of Conway, South Carolina: Barbara Blain-Bellamy
 First African American elected mayor of Camilla, Georgia: Rufus L Davis II
 First African-American woman elected mayor of Toledo, Ohio: Paula Hicks-Hudson
 First African-American woman and first woman elected mayor of Flint, Michigan: Karen Weaver
 First African American and First African American Woman appointed as mayor of Grove Hill, Alabama: Cynthia McGill Jackson

2016 
 First African American elected mayor in San Diego County and Lemon Grove, California: Racquel Vasquez
 First African-American and first African-American female mayor of Midland City, Alabama: Jo Ann Bennett Grimsley
 First African American elected mayor of Norfolk, Virginia: Kenneth Alexander
 First African American elected mayor of Stockton, California: Michael Tubbs
 First African American and First African American Woman elected as mayor of Grove Hill, Alabama: Cynthia McGill Jackson
 First African American elected as mayor of Flagstaff, Arizona: Coral Evans
 First African-American mayor of Abilene, Texas: Anthony Williams
 First African-American mayor of Santa Cruz, California: Martine Watkins, also first biracial mayor

2017 
 First African American elected mayor of Stamps, Arkansas: Brenda Davis
 First African-American woman elected mayor of Charlotte, North Carolina: Vi Lyles
 First African American elected mayor of St. Paul, Minnesota: Melvin Carter
 First African American elected mayor of Waukegan, Illinois: Sam Cunningham
 First African American elected mayor of Aurora, Illinois: Richard Irvin
 First female African American succeeds to the office of mayor of Paterson, New Jersey: Ruby Cotton
 First African American and first female mayor of Mound City, Illinois: Allison Madison
 First female African American appointed as mayor of Paterson, New Jersey: Jane Williams-Warren
 First female African American elected as mayor of Kankakee, Illinois: Chastity Wells-Armstrong
 First African-American mayor of Gardena, California: Tasha Cerda, also the first native American mayor in the state of California

2018 
 First African American elected mayor of Little Rock, Arkansas: Frank Scott Jr.
 First African American mayor of Brookneal, Virginia: James Nowlin
 First African American mayor of Orange County, Florida: Jerry Demings
 First African American mayor of Helena, Montana: Wilmot Collins
 First appointed African American mayor of Danville, Illinois: Rickey Williams Jr.
 First African American mayor of Bridgeport, Pennsylvania: Mark Barbee 
 First African-American mayor of Lathrup Village, Michigan: Mykale (Kelly) Garrett

2019 
 First African American elected Mayor of Manor, Texas: Larry Wallace Jr. 
 First African American woman and first openly gay elected Mayor of Chicago: Lori Lightfoot
 First African American mayor of Lewisburg, West Virginia: Beverly White

 First African American elected mayor of Elyria, Ohio: Frank Whitfield
 First African American elected Mayor of Montgomery, Alabama: Steven Reed
 First African American elected mayor of Talladega, Alabama: Timothy Ragland
 First African American elected mayor of Irmo, South Carolina: Barry Walker
 First African American elected mayor of Eastpointe, Michigan: Monique Owens
 First African American elected mayor of New Castle, Pennsylvania: Chris Frye
 First African American elected mayor of Wyoming, Ohio: Thaddeus Hoffmeister
 First African American and elected by popular vote of Camden, Arkansas: Julian Lott and president of Arkansas Black Mayors Association 2020– present
 First African American elected mayor of Danville, Illinois: Rickey Williams Jr.
 First African American elected mayor of Fort Smith, Arkansas: George McGill

2020s

2020 
 First African American elected mayor of Ferguson, Missouri: Ella Jones
 First African American elected mayor of Lake View, Alabama: Adrain Dudley
 First African American elected mayor of Natchitoches, Louisiana: Ronnie Williams, Jr.
 First African American elected mayor of Tempe, Arizona: Corey Woods
 First elected African American mayor of Williamsport, Pennsylvania: Derek Slaughter
 First African American elected mayor of Los Altos, California: Neysa Fligor
 First elected African American female mayor of Carson, California: Lula Davis-Holmes
 First African American elected mayor of Denton, Texas: Gerard Hudspeth

2021 
 First African American elected mayor of Alton, Illinois: David Goins
 First African American elected mayor of Bloomington, Illinois: Mboka Mwilambwe
 First African American elected mayor of Calumet City, Illinois: Thaddeus Jones
 First African American and first woman to serve as acting mayor of Boston: Kim Janey (upon the resignation of Marty Walsh to take the position of United States Secretary of Labor in the Cabinet of Joe Biden).
 First African American elected mayor of Kansas City, Kansas: Tyrone Garner
 First African American elected mayor of Libertyville, Illinois: Donna Johnson
 First African American elected mayor of Maplewood, Missouri: Nikylan Knapper
 First African American elected mayor of Pittsburgh, Pennsylvania: Edward C. Gainey
 First African American eleted mayor of Little Elm, Texas: Curtis Cornelious
 First African American woman elected mayor of St. Louis: Tishaura Jones
 First African American woman elected mayor of Peekskill, New York: Vivian MacKenzie
 First African American elected mayor of Willard, Missouri: Samuel Snider
 First African American elected mayor of Wiggins, Mississippi: Darrell Berry
 First African American appointed mayor of Gresham, Oregon: Travis Stovall
 First African American elected mayor and first elected mayor of Cleveland Heights, Ohio: Kahlil Seren

2022 
 First African American elected mayor of Milwaukee: Cavalier Johnson
 First African American elected Mayor of Summerton, South Carolina: Tony Junious
 First women elected mayor and first African-American mayor of Gettysburg, Pennsylvania: Rita Frealing
 First African-American elected as mayor of North Las Vegas, Nevada: Pamela Goynes-Brown
 First African-American mayor of Osceola, Arkansas: Joe Harris Jr.
 First African-American mayor of Brooklyn Park, Minnesota: Hollies Winston
 First African-American mayor of Danville, Kentucky: James J. H. Atkins
 First African-American mayor of Long Beach, California: Rex Richardson
 First female African American elected as mayor of Los Angeles: Karen Bass
 First African American mayor of Culver City, California: Daniel Lee

2023 

 First African American appointed mayor of Waynesville, Missouri: Sean Avery Wilson

See also 

 African-American officeholders during and following the Reconstruction era
 List of African-American firsts
 List of African-American U.S. state firsts
 List of African-American United States Cabinet members
 Timeline of the civil rights movement

References

African-American-related controversies
 First
African-American mayors
African-American
African American-related lists